Vaishali is a community development block in Vaishali district of Bihar, India. It is also called Vaishali C. D. Block, as per the census nomenclature.

Block  office

Major roads
SH-74

Villages
Number of Panchayat : 16
Number  of Villages : 112

Panchayat

Villages

Population and communities
Male Population : 75140 (2009 ist.)
Female Population : 71224
Total Population : 146364  
SC Total Population : 26256  
ST Total Population : 461
Minority Total Population : 19830 
Population Density : 1154  
Sex Ratio : 948

Public distribution system
Nos of HHs : 22629 
BPL Card Holders : 21710  
Antodaya Card Holders : 4190
Annapurna Card Holders : 394 
APL : 18932  
Nos of Fair Price Shops: 72

Education
Literacy rate : 49.4% (2001 ist.)
Male literacy rate : 61.7%
Female literacy rate : 36.3%

School
Primary School : 78 (2009 ist.)
Upper Primary School : 61

Banking
Number of banks : 5

References 

Community development blocks in Vaishali district